Carbohydrate metabolism is the whole of the biochemical processes responsible for the metabolic formation, breakdown, and interconversion of carbohydrates in living organisms.

Carbohydrates are central to many essential metabolic pathways. Plants synthesize carbohydrates from carbon dioxide and water through photosynthesis, allowing them to store energy absorbed from sunlight internally. When animals and fungi consume plants, they use cellular respiration to break down these stored carbohydrates to make energy available to cells. Both animals and plants temporarily store the released energy in the form of high-energy molecules, such as adenosine triphosphate (ATP), for use in various cellular processes.

Humans can consume a variety of carbohydrates, digestion breaks down complex carbohydrates into simple monomers (monosaccharides): glucose, fructose, mannose and galactose. After resorption in the gut, the monosaccharides are transported, through the portal vein, to the liver, where all non-glucose monosacharids (fructose, galactose) are transformed into glucose as well. Glucose (blood sugar) is distributed to cells in the tissues, where it is broken down via cellular respiration, or stored as glycogen. In cellular (aerobic) respiration, glucose and oxygen are metabolized to release energy, with carbon dioxide and water as endproducts.

Metabolic pathways

Glycolysis 
Glycolysis is the process of breaking down a glucose molecule into two pyruvate molecules, while storing energy released during this process as adenosine triphosphate (ATP) and nicotinamide adenine dinucleotide (NADH). Nearly all organisms that break down glucose utilize glycolysis. Glucose regulation and product use are the primary categories in which these pathways differ between organisms. In some tissues and organisms, glycolysis is the sole method of energy production. This pathway is common to both anaerobic and aerobic respiration.

Glycolysis consists of ten steps, split into two phases. During the first phase, it requires the breakdown of two ATP molecules. During the second phase, chemical energy from the intermediates is transferred into ATP and NADH. The breakdown of one molecule of glucose results in two molecules of pyruvate, which can be further oxidized to access more energy in later processes.

Glycolysis can be regulated at different steps of the process through feedback regulation. The step that is regulated the most is the third step. This regulation is to ensure that the body is not over-producing pyruvate molecules. The regulation also allows for the storage of glucose molecules into fatty acids. There are various enzymes that are used throughout glycolysis. The enzymes upregulate, downregulate, and feedback regulate the process.

Gluconeogenesis 
Gluconeogenesis (GNG) is a metabolic pathway that results in the generation of glucose from certain non-carbohydrate carbon substrates. It is a ubiquitous process, present in plants, animals, fungi, bacteria, and other microorganisms. In vertebrates, gluconeogenesis occurs mainly in the liver and, to a lesser extent, in the cortex of the kidneys. It is one of two primary mechanisms – the other being degradation of glycogen (glycogenolysis) – used by humans and many other animals to maintain blood sugar levels, avoiding low levels (hypoglycemia). In ruminants, because dietary carbohydrates tend to be metabolized by rumen organisms, gluconeogenesis occurs regardless of fasting, low-carbohydrate diets, exercise, etc.  In many other animals, the process occurs during periods of fasting, starvation, low-carbohydrate diets, or intense exercise.

In humans, substrates for gluconeogenesis may come from any non-carbohydrate sources that can be converted to pyruvate or intermediates of glycolysis (see figure). For the breakdown of proteins, these substrates include glucogenic amino acids (although not ketogenic amino acids); from breakdown of lipids (such as triglycerides), they include glycerol, odd-chain fatty acids (although not even-chain fatty acids, see below); and from other parts of metabolism they include lactate from the Cori cycle. Under conditions of prolonged fasting, acetone derived from ketone bodies can also serve as a substrate, providing a pathway from fatty acids to glucose. Although most gluconeogenesis occurs in the liver, the relative contribution of gluconeogenesis by the kidney is increased in diabetes and prolonged fasting.

The gluconeogenesis pathway is highly endergonic until it is coupled to the hydrolysis of ATP or guanosine triphosphate (GTP), effectively making the process exergonic. For example, the pathway leading from pyruvate to glucose-6-phosphate requires 4 molecules of ATP and 2 molecules of GTP to proceed spontaneously. These ATPs are supplied from fatty acid catabolism via beta oxidation.

Glycogenolysis 
Glycogenolysis refers to the breakdown of glycogen. In the liver, muscles, and the kidney, this process occurs to provide glucose when necessary. A single glucose molecule is cleaved from a branch of glycogen, and is transformed into glucose-1-phosphate during this process. This molecule can then be converted to glucose-6-phosphate, an intermediate in the glycolysis pathway.

Glucose-6-phosphate can then progress through glycolysis. Glycolysis only requires the input of one molecule of ATP when the glucose originates in glycogen. Alternatively, glucose-6-phosphate can be converted back into glucose in the liver and the kidneys, allowing it to raise blood glucose levels if necessary.

Glucagon in the liver stimulates glycogenolysis when the blood glucose is lowered, known as hypoglycemia. The glycogen in the liver can function as a backup source of glucose between meals. Liver glycogen mainly serves the central nervous system. Adrenaline stimulates the breakdown of glycogen in the skeletal muscle during exercise. In the muscles, glycogen ensures a rapidly accessible energy source for movement.

Glycogenesis 
Glycogenesis refers to the process of synthesizing glycogen. In humans, glucose can be converted to glycogen via this process. Glycogen is a highly branched structure, consisting of the core protein Glycogenin, surrounded by branches of glucose units, linked together.  The branching of glycogen increases its solubility, and allows for a higher number of glucose molecules to be accessible for breakdown at the same time. Glycogenesis occurs primarily in the liver, skeletal muscles, and kidney. The Glycogenesis pathway consumes energy, like most synthetic pathways, because an ATP and a UTP are consumed for each molecule of glucose introduced.

Pentose phosphate pathway 
The pentose phosphate pathway is an alternative method of oxidizing glucose. It occurs in the liver, adipose tissue, adrenal cortex, testis, mammary glands, phagocytes, and red blood cells. It produces products that are used in other cell processes, while reducing NADP to NADPH. This pathway is regulated through changes in the activity of glucose-6-phosphate dehydrogenase.

Fructose metabolism 
Fructose must undergo certain extra steps in order to enter the glycolysis pathway. Enzymes located in certain tissues can add a phosphate group to fructose. This phosphorylation creates fructose-6-phosphate, an intermediate in the glycolysis pathway that can be broken down directly in those tissues. This pathway occurs in the muscles, adipose tissue, and kidney. In the liver, enzymes produce fructose-1-phosphate, which enters the glycolysis pathway and is later cleaved into glyceraldehyde and dihydroxyacetone phosphate.

Galactose metabolism 
Lactose, or milk sugar, consists of one molecule of glucose and one molecule of galactose. After separation from glucose, galactose travels to the liver for conversion to glucose. Galactokinase uses one molecule of ATP to phosphorylate galactose. The phosphorylated galactose is then converted to glucose-1-phosphate, and then eventually glucose-6-phosphate, which can be broken down in glycolysis.

Energy production
Many steps of carbohydrate metabolism allow the cells to access energy and store it more transiently in ATP. The cofactors NAD+ and FAD are sometimes reduced during this process to form NADH and FADH2, which drive the creation of ATP in other processes. A molecule of NADH can produce 1.5–2.5 molecules of ATP, whereas a molecule of FADH2 yields 1.5 molecules of ATP.

Typically, the complete breakdown of one molecule of glucose by aerobic respiration (i.e. involving both glycolysis and the citric-acid cycle) is usually about 30–32 molecules of ATP. Oxidation of one gram of carbohydrate yields approximately 4 kcal of energy.

Hormonal regulation
Glucoregulation is the maintenance of steady levels of glucose in the body.

Hormones released from the pancreas regulate the overall metabolism of glucose. Insulin and glucagon are the primary hormones involved in maintaining a steady level of glucose in the blood, and the release of each is controlled by the amount of nutrients currently available. The amount of insulin released in the blood and sensitivity of the cells to the insulin both determine the amount of glucose that cells break down. Increased levels of glucagon activates the enzymes that catalyze glycogenolysis, and inhibits the enzymes that catalyze glycogenesis. Conversely, glycogenesis is enhanced and glycogenolysis inhibited when there are high levels of insulin in the blood.

The level of circulatory glucose (known informally as "blood sugar"), as well as the detection of nutrients in the Duodenum is the most important factor determining the amount of glucagon or insulin produced. The release of glucagon is precipitated by low levels of blood glucose, whereas high levels of blood glucose stimulates cells to produce insulin. Because the level of circulatory glucose is largely determined by the intake of dietary carbohydrates, diet controls major aspects of metabolism via insulin. In humans, insulin is made by beta cells in the pancreas, fat is stored in adipose tissue cells, and glycogen is both stored and released as needed by liver cells. Regardless of insulin levels, no glucose is released to the blood from internal glycogen stores from muscle cells.

Carbohydrates as storage 
Carbohydrates are typically stored as long polymers of glucose molecules with glycosidic bonds for structural support (e.g. chitin, cellulose) or for energy storage (e.g. glycogen, starch). However, the strong affinity of most carbohydrates for water makes storage of large quantities of carbohydrates inefficient due to the large molecular weight of the solvated water-carbohydrate complex. In most organisms, excess carbohydrates are regularly catabolised to form acetyl-CoA, which is a feed stock for the fatty acid synthesis pathway; fatty acids, triglycerides, and other lipids are commonly used for long-term energy storage. The hydrophobic character of lipids makes them a much more compact form of energy storage than hydrophilic carbohydrates. Gluconeogenesis permits glucose to be synthesized from various sources, including lipids.

In some animals (such as termites) and some microorganisms (such as protists and bacteria), cellulose can be disassembled during digestion and absorbed as glucose.

Human diseases
 Diabetes mellitus
 Lactose intolerance
 Fructose malabsorption
 Galactosemia
 Glycogen storage disease

References

External links

 
 BBC - GCSE Bitesize - Biology | Humans | Glucoregulation
 Sugar4Kids

Metabolism

de:Glucose#Biochemie